MSLN may refer to:
MSLN (gene)
Magical Girl Lyrical Nanoha, 2004 Japanese TV series, derived from Mahō Shōjo Ririkaru Nanoha